Liberty Township is one of twelve townships in Warren County, Indiana, United States. According to the 2010 census, its population was 896 and it contained 362 housing units.

History
Liberty Township was formed in March 1843.

The Andrew Brier House was listed on the National Register of Historic Places in 1986.

Geography
It contains the Potholes at Fall Creek Gorge, a scenic natural location owned and maintained by the Nature Conservancy. Big Pine Creek enters the township from Adams Township to the north and winds to the southeast, briefly entering Warren Township before emptying into the Wabash River near Attica. The stream of Fall Creek also runs through this township.

The north end of the county seat of Williamsport extends into the southeast corner of the township. In addition, there are three small unincorporated towns in the township. Carbondale is located just north of the point where State Road 63 begins at U.S. Route 41. The settlement of Five Points is now defunct, but existed along the present-day route of U.S. Route 41 in the southeastern part of the township.

Cemeteries
The township contains these five cemeteries: Bartlett, Brier, Goodwine, Kester and McCabe.

Transportation
U.S. Route 41 enters the township from the north and makes its way to the southeast toward Attica. Indiana State Road 28 passes into the southeast corner of the township from Williamsport and leaves on its way to Attica. Indiana State Road 55 runs along the township's eastern border on its way from Attica in the south to Pine Village in the north.

Education
Liberty Township is part of the Metropolitan School District of Warren County.

Government
Liberty Township has a trustee who administers rural fire protection and ambulance service, provides relief to the poor, manages cemetery care, and performs farm assessment, among other duties. The trustee is assisted in these duties by a three-member township board. The trustees and board members are elected to four-year terms.

Liberty Township is part of Indiana's 4th congressional district, Indiana House of Representatives District 42, and Indiana State Senate District 38.

References

 
 United States Census Bureau TIGER/Line Shapefiles

Bibliography

External links

Townships in Warren County, Indiana
Populated places established in 1843
Townships in Indiana
1843 establishments in Indiana